Wang Shijia is a Chinese swimmer. She competed at the 2012 Summer Olympics in the Women's 4 x 100 metre freestyle relay and Women's 200 metre freestyle for China.

See also
China at the 2012 Summer Olympics - Swimming

References

1993 births
Living people
Swimmers from Liaoning
Olympic swimmers of China
Swimmers at the 2012 Summer Olympics
Swimmers at the 2016 Summer Olympics
Chinese female freestyle swimmers
People from Fuxin
Asian Games medalists in swimming
Swimmers at the 2010 Asian Games
Universiade medalists in swimming
Asian Games gold medalists for China
Medalists at the 2010 Asian Games
Universiade silver medalists for China
Medalists at the 2015 Summer Universiade